Haunted is the debut album by American death metal band Six Feet Under. It was released via Metal Blade Records in 1995, just before Chris Barnes' departure from Cannibal Corpse.

The picture used for the album art is from the cover of the 1990 film The Haunting of Morella.

Track listing 
All Songs written by Chris Barnes and Allen West.

Personnel 
Six Feet Under
Chris Barnes – vocals
Allen West – guitars
Terry Butler – bass
Greg Gall – drums

Production
Produced by Scott Burns and Brian Slagel
Mixed and engineered by Scott Burns
Mastered by Eddy Schreyer at Future Disc
Artwork
Band photo by Chris Coxwell
Photography by Ann-Marie Blood
Design and computer imaging by Bryan Ames
Cover art by Jim Warren

References 

1995 debut albums
Six Feet Under (band) albums
Metal Blade Records albums
Albums produced by Scott Burns (record producer)
Albums recorded at Morrisound Recording